Hiken Shah (born 15 November 1984) is an Indian cricketer who plays for Mumbai in domestic cricket. He is a left-hand batsman and leg-break bowler.
 
Shah made his debut for Mumbai in 2006 after consistent performances in inter-university cricket. However, he could not keep his
place in the team as the Mumbai middle-order already consisted of big names such as Sachin Tendulkar, Rohit Sharma, Abhishek Nayar and Amol Muzumdar. In 2012, he had a great run in the Safi Darashah tournament and the tour game against the visiting England side, due to which he got the No.3 spot in the Mumbai batting order in the Ranji Trophy.

In January 2016, he was given a five-year ban by the BCCI for his role in the 2013 Indian Premier League spot-fixing and betting case.

References

External links 

1984 births
Living people
Indian cricketers
Mumbai cricketers
Jammu and Kashmir cricketers
West Zone cricketers
Cricketers banned for corruption